"Get Up Stand Up" is a 2004 song by the Italian dance project Stellar Project, created by songwriter and producer Stefano Sorrentino, featuring American actress and singer Brandi Emma.

The song reached number one on the US dance airplay chart dated 20 November 2004. The song also reached number 14 on the UK Singles Chart in 2004.

Track listing
 "Get Up Stand Up" (Phunk Investigation Radio Mix) – 2:55
 "Get Up Stand Up" (Phunk Investigation Club Vocal Mix) – 7:46
 "Get Up Stand Up" (F & W Remix) – 6:11
 "Get Up Stand Up" (Paul Jackson Head Banger Mix) – 6:56
 "Get Up Stand Up" (Phunk Investigation ElettroDub Mix) – 7:48

Charts

References

2004 singles
2004 songs
House music songs
Universal Music Group singles